Red Bend Catholic College is an independent Roman Catholic co-educational secondary day and boarding school located in  in the Central West region of New South Wales, Australia. The College is run by the Marist Brothers, a religious institute. Established in 1926, the College has enrolled approximately 800 students from Year 7 to Year 12.

History
Prior to 1977, the Catholic education of students in this region was provided by three secondary schools; Our Lady of Mercy College, Forbes; Our Lady of Mercy High School, Parkes; and Marist Brothers' College, Forbes.

In February 1977, these three schools combined to form one co-educational High School, with the name of Red Bend Catholic College, at the site of the former Marist Brothers' College, on the banks of the Lachlan River. This merger brought together the teaching traditions of the Mercy Sisters and the Marist Brothers.

Principals
The following individuals have served as College Principal:

House system
 Basil House:  Colour: Green, Motto: "Action Not Words."
 Denis House:  Colour: Red, Motto: "Second to None."
 Loyola House: Colour: Yellow, Motto: "Leading the Way with Strength and Honour."
 Xavier House: Colour: Blue, Motto: "Determination, Participation, Success."
 Mcauley House: Colour: Purple, Motto: “ Pride in excellence.”
 Chisholm House: Colour: Orange

College Crest
 The Motto: Per Angusta ad Augusta
 The Colours: Sky Blue & Navy Blue
 The Cross: The Mercy Cross as worn by all Sisters of Mercy
 The M: Marist Emblem
 The Twelve Stars: Crown of Mary

See also 

 List of Catholic schools in New South Wales
 Catholic education in Australia

References

External links
Red Bend Catholic College Website
Marist Brothers Website
Marist Brothers Australian Website
Sisters of Mercy Australian Website

Catholic secondary schools in New South Wales
Educational institutions established in 1926
1926 establishments in Australia
Boarding schools in New South Wales
Association of Marist Schools of Australia
Catholic boarding schools in Australia
Forbes, New South Wales